Software environment may refer to:
 Run-time system
 Audio synthesis environment